Christ the King Basilica is a Roman Catholic minor basilica dedicated to the Christ the King located in Moosonee, Ontario, Canada. The basilica served as the cathedral of the Diocese of Moosonee from 1936 to its suppression in 2016. 

On June 22, 2020, the church was designated as a minor basilica.

References

External links
 Parish website

Roman Catholic churches in Ontario
Basilica churches in Canada